Endotricha altitudinalis is a species of snout moth in the genus Endotricha. It was described by Viette in 1957, and is known from São Tomé & Principe.

References

Moths described in 1957
Endotrichini
Insects of São Tomé and Príncipe
Moths of Africa